Tamizhaga Dravida Makkal Katchi (Tamil Dravidian People's Party), political party in the Indian state of Tamil Nadu. The party general secretary is A. Gandhian.

In the 2001 Tamil Nadu assembly elections TDMK supported the Dravida Munnetra Kazhagam (DMK)-led National Democratic Alliance (India) (NDA).

Political parties in Tamil Nadu
Political parties with year of establishment missing